Otter Creek is a stream in Carlton County, Minnesota, in the United States. It is a tributary of the Saint Louis River.

"Otter Creek" is probably an English translation of the Ojibwe-language name.

See also
List of rivers of Minnesota

References

Rivers of Carlton County, Minnesota
Rivers of Minnesota